Cirquent (formerly Softlab Group) was a subsidiary of NTT Data that provides IT, consulting and professional services. The company's headquarters is in Munich, Germany, with offices in Austria, Switzerland and the UK. The company specializes in developing custom software solutions, integrating third-party systems, and providing consulting services to help organizations implement digital transformation initiatives. Customers include Allianz Germany, BMW Group, Deutsche Börse, Heidelberger Druckmaschinen, Kabel Deutschland, Munich Re, O2, and T-Mobile.

Cirquent UK 
Cirquent Ltd, a fully owned subsidiary of Cirquent GmbH, was founded in the UK, as Softlab Ltd., in 1989 to sell and support the Maestro I product line. Initially based in Hammersmith, the company expanded with the launch of Maestro II, a software development environment used by British Gas plc and Barclays Bank.

Softlab was purchased by BMW AG in the 1990s and following the purchase of Rover Group by BMW, Softlab Ltd. acquired AT&T Istel's Rover Group services, increasing in size from about 60 staff to one of over 500. With the acquisition came a move of headquarters near Birmingham. The business moved from software tools to CRM and Contact center system integration. In 2001 BMW Group sold Rover, and soon after the automotive team was sold to Computer Sciences Corporation.

Softlab continued to focus on CRM software and contact centre projects, partnering with Microsoft (Dynamics CRM), Oracle (Siebel), Genesys, Interactive Intelligence, CDC (Pivotal) and BMC (Remedy). Following acquisitions, in 2008 Softlab was rebranded Cirquent.

In 2008 a majority 72.9% stake in Cirquent was taken by NTT Data.

References

External links
 Cirquent's international site 
 Cirquent's automotive site 
 Cirquent's German site
 Cirquents UK Site 

Companies based in Munich
German brands
Consulting firms established in 1971
Software companies of Germany